Art Nouveau'' Magazine is a quarterly American visual art and design and culture magazine. The online version, an-mag.com, launched in 2007. The magazine went defunct in 2011.

IssuesArt Nouveau Magazine's first issue, which launched January 2008, included interviews with musicians KT Tunstall, J Davey, PPT, Danny! and Farewell, visual artists Kris Lewis, Dave White, Brand Nu, actors Denzel Washington, Gabrielle Union and Morris Chestnut.Art Nouveau's first print issue launched June 1, 2010, with artwork by Ron English.

For their three-year anniversary, Art Nouveau Magazine hosted a party that included rapper Theophilus London.Art Nouveau'''s second issue entitled "Bold" showed Bilal and Coco & Breezy on the cover.

References

External links 
Official site

2008 establishments in the United States
Magazines established in 2008
Music magazines published in the United States
Visual arts magazines published in the United States
Bimonthly magazines published in the United States
Online magazines published in the United States